Doug Baird may refer to:

 Doug Baird (Australian footballer) (born 1950), Australian rules footballer
 Doug Baird (baseball) (1891–1967), American baseball player
 Doug Baird (footballer, born 1935) (1935–2002), Scottish footballer

See also
 Douglas Baird (born 1953), American legal scholar
 Douglas Baird (Indian Army officer) (1877–1963), British officer in the Indian Army